The Triumph of Death is a Danish ballet from 1971 with choreography by Flemming Flindt and music by Thomas Koppel recorded by The Savage Rose. Libretto by Flemming Flindt, based on Eugène Ionesco's play Jeux de massacre.

References

External links 
 Royal Danish Theatre

Ballets by Flemming Flindt
1971 ballet premieres